Tusker Project Fame is an East African reality-singing competition show sponsored by Tusker Lager.  The show is similar to American Idol and Project Fame South Africa, musicians compete to win cash and a one-year record deal with Universal Music Group South Africa.

Tusker Project Fame has aired 5 seasons. To be eligible to participate, one must be at least 21 years of age and must be able to sing and perform or sing and play and instrument.

Controversy 

Past Tusker Project Fame winners have criticized the show organizers for not living up to their promises, stating that the Tusker Company makes a huge profit, but fails to support its winners in after the season is over.

Past Project Fame Winners

Contestants

Season 1

Season 2

Season 3

Season 6

References 

Singing talent shows
Kenyan reality television series
2013 Kenyan television series debuts
2010s Kenyan television series
Citizen TV original programming